Danny Rombley (born 26 November 1979, in Amersfoort) is a Dutch baseball player for the Amsterdam Pirates. He also played six years in Minor League Baseball.

Career 
Rombley was selected by coach Robert Eenhoorn in the team that represents the Netherlands at the 2008 Summer Olympics in Beijing,  and 2014 European Baseball Championship.

References

External links
 Rombley's profile at honkbalsite.com 

Dutch baseball players
Olympic baseball players of the Netherlands
2006 World Baseball Classic players
Baseball players at the 2008 Summer Olympics
2009 World Baseball Classic players
Sportspeople from Amersfoort
Dutch people of Aruban descent
1982 births
Living people
Brevard County Manatees players
Cape Fear Crocs players
Clinton LumberKings players
Corendon Kinheim players
DOOR Neptunus players
Gulf Coast Expos players
Harrisburg Senators players
L&D Amsterdam Pirates players
Dutch expatriate baseball people in the United States
UVV players
Vaessen Pioniers players
Vermont Expos players